Despina Liozidou Shermister is a Greek-born Israeli lexicographer and translator.

Biography
Despina Shermister is the author of the first modern Greek-Hebrew, Hebrew-Greek dictionary.

Published works
 Despina Liozidou Shermister, מילון עברי-יווני יווני-עברי, Kinneret Zmora-Bitan Dvir

Translations
 Alexandros Papadiamantis, סוחרי האומות (The merchants of the nations, with Chaim Pessah (2015), כתב
 Christos Chomenidis, הילד החכם (The Wise Kid), with Chaim Pessah (2012),  Yediot Aharonot Books
 Christos Chomenidis, תרנגול ללא רחמים, with Chaim Pessah (2009),  Yediot Aharonot Books, 
 Nikos Kazantzakis, נחש ושושן צחור, with Chaim Pessah (2010), אבן חושן, 
 Odysseas Elytis, מונוגרמה (The Monogram) in magazine Moznaim, with Chaim Pessah (2010),

References

External links
 Despina Liozidou Shermister - ΕΚΕΒΙ

1962 births
Living people
Israeli translators
Translator